Zygmunt Henryk Berling (27 April 1896 – 11 July 1980) was a Polish general and politician. He fought for the independence of Poland in the early 20th century. Berling was a co-founder and commander of the First Polish Army, which fought on the Eastern Front of World War II.

Military career before World War II
Zygmunt Berling was born in Limanowa, then part of the Austro-Hungarian Empire, on 27 April 1896. He joined the Polish Legions of Józef Piłsudski in 1914, serving in the 2nd and 4th Legions Infantry Regiment (Pułk Piechoty Legionów). Between the "oath crisis" of June 1917 and October 1918 he served in the Austro-Hungarian Army. At the end of the World War I he joined the reborn Polish Army, becoming the commander of an infantry company in the 4th Infantry Regiment. During the Polish–Soviet War, he gained fame as an able commander during the Battle of Lwów and received the Virtuti Militari medal.

After the war, he remained in the military and in 1923 he was promoted to the rank of major, first serving on staff of the 15th Infantry Division of V District Corps Command in Kraków. In 1930, he was promoted to lieutenant colonel and started his service as a commanding officer, first in the 6th Infantry Regiment and then in the 4th Infantry Regiment. Berling retired from active duty in June 1939 because of divorce problems and conflicts with his superiors.

World War II
Berling did not participate in the Polish defence effort during the Invasion of Poland in 1939. After the city of Vilnius was occupied by the Soviet Union under the terms of the Molotov–Ribbentrop Pact, Berling, along with many other Polish officers, was arrested by the Soviet secret police (NKVD). He remained in prison until 1940, first in Starobilsk and later Moscow, eventually agreeing to cooperate with the Soviets.

After the Sikorski–Mayski agreement of 17 August 1941, Berling was nominated to be chief of staff of the recreated 5th Infantry Division, and later commander of the temporary camp for Polish soldiers in Krasnovodsk. Berling refused to leave the Soviet Union with the army led by Władysław Anders, of which Berling was formally a member. Along with two other officers, he was tried in absentia before an Anders' Army court which sentenced them to death. The sentence was vacated by General Kazimierz Sosnkowski, the Polish commander-in-chief of forces loyal to the London government in exile.

From 1940, Berling had been involved in efforts to create a Polish division in the Soviet Union, at first within the Soviet Red Army. In September 1942 and during the following months, he and Wanda Wasilewska appealed to Joseph Stalin for permission to establish the Polish division. On 8 April 1943, Berling proposed the establishment of a new Polish army; permission was granted after the break in Soviet-Polish diplomatic relations.

In May 1943, the communist-led Polish People's Army was created in the Soviet Union. It was a new formation of Polish Armed Forces in the East. Berling was nominated to be the commander of its first unit, the 1st Tadeusz Kościuszko Infantry Division, and was promoted to general by Stalin. He became the overall deputy commander of the Polish Army on the Eastern Front on 22 July 1944.

On 1 August 1944, the underground Polish Home Army, loyal to the Polish government-in-exile in London, began the 63-day long Warsaw Uprising, an attempt to free the city from the occupying German forces before the arrival of the Red Army. On 15–23 September, when the uprising was in its later phase, with his First Polish Army on the east bank of the Vistula River and the Praga district of Warsaw already secured, Berling led a rescue effort that involved crossing the Vistula and establishing a bridgehead on the west bank. The failed operation, possibly not fully consulted with Berling's Soviet military superiors, resulted in heavy Polish Army casualties and may have caused Berling's dismissal from his post soon thereafter. He was transferred to the War Academy in Moscow, where he remained until his return to Poland in 1947. In Poland, Berling organized and directed the Academy of General Staff (Akademia Sztabu Generalnego). He retired from the military in 1953.

Government career
Zygmunt Berling held a variety of government positions after 1953. Between 1953 and 1956, he was Undersecretary of State in the Ministry of National Agriculture Industries (Ministerstwo Państwowych Gospodarstw Rolnych), between 1956 and 1957 he was Undersecretary of State in the Ministry of Agriculture (Ministerstwo Rolnictwa) and from 1957 to 1970 he was General Inspector of Hunting (Inspektor Generalny Łowiectwa) in the Ministry of Forestry (Ministerstwo Leśnictwa). In 1963, he joined the Polish United Workers' Party.

He is buried at Powązki Military Cemetery in Warsaw.

Awards and decorations
:
 Order of the Builders of People's Poland
 Grand Cross of the Order of Polonia Restituta
 Commander's Cross with Star of the Order of Polonia Restituta
 Silver Cross of the Virtuti Militari
 Order of the Cross of Grunwald (1st class)
 Order of the Cross of Grunwald (3rd class)
 Order of the Banner of Work (1st class), twice
 Order of the Banner of Work (2nd class)
 Cross of Valour
 Cross of Valour, twice
 Gold Cross of Merit
 Medal of Victory and Freedom 1945 
 Cross of Independence
:
 Order of Lenin, twice
 Medal "For the Victory over Germany in the Great Patriotic War 1941–1945" 
 Jubilee Medal "Twenty Years of Victory in the Great Patriotic War 1941-1945" 
 Jubilee Medal "Thirty Years of Victory in the Great Patriotic War 1941–1945" 
 Order of Friendship of Peoples

See also

 Polish contribution to World War II

Notes

References
 
 Short bio and photo of pre-war Jagiellonian University ID 
 Biography at the Institute of National Remembrance 

1896 births
1980 deaths
People from Limanowa
People from the Kingdom of Galicia and Lodomeria
20th-century Polish people
Polish people of German descent
Polish people of Swedish descent
Polish People's Army generals
Polish United Workers' Party members
Polish legionnaires (World War I)
Polish Auxiliary Corps personnel
Austro-Hungarian military personnel of World War I
Polish military personnel of World War II
Polish people of the Polish–Soviet War
Recipients of the Order of the Banner of Work
Recipients of the Order of the Builders of People's Poland
Recipients of the Virtuti Militari (1943–1989)
Commanders with Star of the Order of Polonia Restituta
Grand Crosses of the Order of Polonia Restituta
Recipients of the Cross of Independence
Recipients of the Cross of Valour (Poland)
Recipients of the Order of the Cross of Grunwald, 1st class
Recipients of the Gold Cross of Merit (Poland)
Recipients of the Order of Friendship of Peoples
Recipients of the Order of Lenin
Polish expatriates in the Soviet Union
Polish people detained by the NKVD
Military Academy of the General Staff of the Armed Forces of the Soviet Union alumni